Lincolnshire County Council in England is elected every four years.

Political control
The first election to the council was held in 1973, initially operating as a shadow authority before coming into its powers on 1 April 1974. Political control of the council since 1973 has been held by the following parties:

Leadership
The leaders of the council since 1973 have been:

Council elections
1973 Lincolnshire County Council election
1977 Lincolnshire County Council election
1981 Lincolnshire County Council election (boundary changes)
1985 Lincolnshire County Council election
1989 Lincolnshire County Council election
1993 Lincolnshire County Council election
1997 Lincolnshire County Council election
2001 Lincolnshire County Council election (boundary changes increased the number of seats by 1)
2005 Lincolnshire County Council election
2009 Lincolnshire County Council election
2013 Lincolnshire County Council election
2017 Lincolnshire County Council election
2021 Lincolnshire County Council election

County result maps

By-election results

1997-2001

2001-2005

2005-2009

2009-2013

References

 By-election results

External links
Lincolnshire County Council

 
Council elections in the East Midlands
Council elections in Lincolnshire
County council elections in England